Lligwy is an electoral ward of north east Anglesey.

It may also refer to:

Capel Lligwy
Din Lligwy
Lligwy Bay
Lligwy Burial Chamber
in this area.
Note that the River Llugwy is on mainland Wales.